Radio Clyde is a group of two Independent Local Radio stations serving Glasgow and West Central Scotland. Radio Clyde is owned and operated by Bauer, based at studios in Clydebank, West Dunbartonshire and forms part of Bauer's Hits Radio and Greatest Hits Radio Network of local stations.

History 
Radio Clyde began broadcasting as the commercial radio station in Scotland at 10.30pm on Monday 31 December 1973.  It was the first ILR station outside London, on 261 metres medium wave and 95.1 FM (later moving to 102.5 FM). Its original slogan was Radio Clyde, 261, all together now. The station's studios were originally located at the Anderston Centre complex within Glasgow city centre, but moved to its current site at Clydebank in 1983. 

During the 1980s, under Programme Controller Alex Dickson, the station maintained a commitment to the arts, including outside broadcasts by the Scottish National Orchestra and other orchestras in its programming.  It also broadcast Interact, a two-hour weekly arts magazine programme, and employed a full-time drama producer who commissioned work performed by prominent Scottish actors such as Eileen McCallum and Bill Paterson.

Radio Clyde's output was split into two distinct services on Friday 12 August 1988, with the launch of a separate Clyde FM service carrying chart music at weekends. The split became permanent on Wednesday 3 January 1990, with the AM service carrying a classic hits format. In line with other UK stations, by this time the AM broadcast was advertised by its frequency of 1152 kHz, rather than its equivalent wavelength of 261 meters.

Radio Clyde was controlled by Scottish Radio Holdings (SRH) until 2005, when the company was acquired by Emap. It changed hands again in 2008, when Emap sold their consumer magazines and radio business units to current owner Bauer Media.

A third service was launched on Monday 19 January 2015 as Clyde 3, carrying a locally branded version of The Hits on DAB, with opt-outs for local news, traffic and advertising. From 1 September 2017, the local City 3 branding of the stations on DAB was withdrawn, in favour of reverting to using The Hits name.

A fourth station, Clyde Rocks, was launched as a 30-day trial on Wednesday 20 April 2016, with the intention of the outcome of the trial being used to form a bid for the 96.3 FM radio licence, which had recently been vacated by its former operator, XFM Scotland. Ultimately, however, Bauer Radio were unsuccessful in their bid, and the licence was awarded by Ofcom to another bidder, Rock Radio.

Notable past presenters include Ross King, who was the station's youngest ever DJ, and is now based in Hollywood, from where he appears regularly on Good Morning Britain and Lorraine. Other names are Paul Coia, Mary Lee, Ken Sykora, Richard Park, Tiger Tim Stevens, Mark Goodier, Tom Russell (who presented the long running Friday Night Rock Show) and Dougie Donnelly. BBC Breakfast anchor Bill Turnbull began his career in journalism at the station.

Present 
Radio Clyde forms one of Bauer's main radio production centres. As well as local programming for Glasgow and the West of Scotland - predominantly on Clyde 1 - the station also produces networked programming for the three City networks in Scotland and northern England.

The station's newsroom is also one of the largest in commercial radio, producing local and national bulletins as well as extensive sports coverage, including live football commentaries and a nightly phone-in under the Superscoreboard banner.

See also
Clyde 1
Clyde 2

References

External links
Clyde 1
Clyde 2

Bauer Radio
Radio stations in Glasgow
Radio stations established in 1973